Conservative Students is the student wing of the Conservative People's Party in Denmark. It has branch organizations at most of the Danish universities. The organisation is a founding member of the European Democrat Students.

External links
Conservative Students - national website

Student wings of political parties in Denmark
Student wings of conservative parties
International Young Democrat Union